The Abou Ben Adhem Shrine Mosque (often known locally as "the Shrine Mosque" or simply "the Shrine") is a building of arabesque design located in downtown Springfield, Missouri, United States. It was built in 1923 for a cost of $600,000. It is owned by the Abou Ben Adhem Shriners and for many years was the site of the annual Shrine Circus.  The five-story building includes a large auditorium with seating for over 4,000. The name derives from Ibrahim ibn Adham, taken from the poem "Abou Ben Adhem" by Leigh Hunt.

It was listed on the National Register of Historic Places in 1982.

References

Shriners
Buildings and structures on U.S. Route 66
Clubhouses on the National Register of Historic Places in Missouri
Masonic buildings completed in 1920
Masonic buildings in Missouri
Culture of Springfield, Missouri
Buildings and structures in Springfield, Missouri
National Register of Historic Places in Greene County, Missouri
Moorish Revival architecture in Missouri
1920 establishments in Missouri